Allan Glaisyer Minns (1858 – 16 September 1930)  was a medical doctor, and the first black man to become a mayor in Britain.

Life
Born in the Inagua district of the Bahamas, Minns was one of the nine children of John Minns (1811–1863) and Ophelia ( Bunch, 1817 – 1902) and their youngest son. His grandfather, also called John Minns, had emigrated about 1801 from England to the Bahamas, where he married Rosette, a former African slave. 

Minns was educated at Nassau Grammar School and Guy's Hospital in London. He was registered with the British Medical Association on 14 February 1884; his qualifications were MRCS (1881), and LRCP (1884). He was based in Thetford from 1885 until 1923, when he moved to Dorking where he died. His eldest brother, Pembroke Minns (1840–1912), was already in medical practice in Thetford when he moved there. 

In 1903 Minns was elected to the town council of Thetford, Norfolk, and the next year was elected as mayor, serving two one-year terms as mayor.

He was twice married; first to Emily Pearson (1859–1892) in 1888 and secondly to Gertrude Ann Morton in 1896. He had children by both wives.

His son Allan Noel Minns (1891 – 1921), also a doctor, was one of the few black officers to serve in the British Army during the First World War.

John Archer, elected mayor of Battersea in 1913, had been thought to be the first black British mayor.

References

External links
 

 Allan Glaisyer Minns: The First Black Mayor of a British Town

1858 births
1930 deaths
19th-century English medical doctors
20th-century English medical doctors
Bahamian people of English descent
Bahamian emigrants to England
Black British politicians
Black British people in health professions
Mayors of places in Norfolk
People from Inagua
People from Thetford